Andrea Hlaváčková and Lucie Hradecká were the defending champions, but Hradecká could not participate this year due to injury. Hlaváčková played alongside Tímea Babos and successfully defended the title, defeating Nicole Melichar and Anna Smith in the final, 6–2, 3–6, [10–3].

Seeds

Draw

Draw

References
 Draw

2017 Women's Doubles
Kremlin Cup – Doubles